"Na Na Na (Dulce Niña)" (English: "Na Na Na (Sweet Girl)"), also known as "Mi Dulce Niña" (English: "My Sweet Girl"), is a song by Mexican-American cumbia group A.B. Quintanilla y Los Kumbia Kings. It was released in 2005 as the third single from their fourth studio album Fuego (2005).

The song was covered in 2006 by the Argentinian cumbia artist Chilli Fernandez and his little brother, Nico Fernandez.

Personnel
 Written by A.B. Quintanilla, Luigi Giraldo, Cruz Martínez
 Produced by A.B. Quintanilla and Cruz Martínez
 Vocals by Pee Wee

Charts

Weekly charts

Year-end charts

Remix

"Na Na Na (Dulce Niña) (Remix)", also known as "Mi Dulce Niña (Remix)", is a song by Mexican-American cumbia group A.B. Quintanilla y Los Kumbia Kings. The remix was released in 2006. It has Pee Wee singing with other Kumbia Kings members Abel Talamántez and Megga. A music video was recorded as well. Although the remix for "Na Na Na (Dulce Niña)" is a single for the album Fuego it is not part of the album.

Remix personnel
 Written by A.B. Quintanilla, Luigi Giraldo, Cruz Martínez
 Produced by A.B. Quintanilla and Cruz Martínez
 Vocals by Pee Wee, Abel Talamántez and Megga
 Background vocals by Nando and Pangie

References

External links
 
 

2004 songs
2005 singles
Kumbia Kings songs
Songs written by A. B. Quintanilla
Songs written by Cruz Martínez
Song recordings produced by A. B. Quintanilla
Song recordings produced by Cruz Martínez
EMI Latin singles